During his long career, American-born British film director Terry Gilliam has worked on a number of projects which never progressed beyond the pre-production stage under his direction.  Some of these productions fell in development hell or were cancelled. The following is a list of projects in roughly chronological order.

20th century

Theseus and the Minotaur
Right after he finished Jabberwocky (1977), Gilliam’s next film project was going to be Theseus and the Minotaur, based on Greek mythology.  The film was shelved when Gilliam chose to make Time Bandits (1981) instead.

Watchmen 
In 1989, Gilliam and film producer Joel Silver unsuccessfully attempted to make a film adaptation of Alan Moore's Watchmen.  Gilliam was reportedly Moore's first choice to direct the film.  Gilliam tried to make the film again in 1996 but was unsuccessful.

A Scanner Darkly
In the early 1990s, Gilliam attempted to make a film adaptation of Philip K. Dick’s A Scanner Darkly.

The Defective Detective
In 1992, it was reported that Gilliam was going to make The Defective Detective next after The Fisher King (1991), only to abandon it in favor of making a Don Quixote film.  Then, Gilliam worked on The Defective Detective again to only to reject it in favor of directing 12 Monkeys (1995) instead.  Then, the Los Angeles Times reported in 1996 that Gilliam was working on The Defective Detective script with Richard LaGravenese.  According to the L.A. Times, the story was "about a middle-aged New York cop who’s having a nervous breakdown and ends up in a fantasy world."  The film was to have been produced by Scott Rudin and Margie Simkin and be distributed by Paramount Pictures. Nicolas Cage was to star in the film.  In addition to Cage, Bruce Willis, Cameron Diaz and Nick Nolte were attached to the project. Danny DeVito was also attached to the project.  Gilliam claims that Sean Connery was also involved.  In February 1997, Paramount put the film in turnaround.

In June 2015, Gilliam hinted that The Defective Detective could possibly be made as a miniseries from Amazon Prime Video.  Variety reported in November that same year that Gilliam and LaGravenese regained the rights to the script from Paramount and "reworked it as a six-hour miniseries."

A Connecticut Yankee in King Arthur's Court
It was reported in 1993 that Gilliam was going to direct a film adaptation of Mark Twain's A Connecticut Yankee in King Arthur's Court for Warner Bros. and producer Jerry Weintraub, with the script written by Robert Mark Kamen.  The film got cancelled when financing fell through.

A Tale of Two Cities
In 1994, Gilliam attempted to make a film adaptation of Charles Dickens' A Tale of Two Cities with Mel Gibson starring.  However, Gibson dropped out of the project in favor of directing and starring in Braveheart (1995).  After Gibson left the project, Gilliam replaced him with Liam Neeson and attempted to make the film via half the initial budget to no avail. Madeleine Stowe was also attached to the project.  The film was ultimately shelved due to budget and casting reasons.  Gilliam then made 12 Monkeys (1995) instead.  When asked in 2009 if he still expressed interest in making the film, Gilliam replied, "Nah.  That’s dead.  That’s over."

Time Bandits II
In 1996, Gilliam and Charles McKeown wrote two drafts of an unproduced script titled Time Bandits II, which would have been the sequel to Time Bandits (1981).  Gilliam was to have produced the sequel and not direct it.  In 2001, Gilliam and McKeown attempted to make Time Bandits II as a television miniseries for the Hallmark Channel.

21st century

Good Omens
In 2002, Gilliam attempted to direct a film adaptation of Terry Pratchett and Neil Gaiman's Good Omens. Johnny Depp and Robin Williams were to have appeared in the film as the demon Crowley and the angel Aziraphale respectively.  The film never came to fruition.  According to Gilliam, the film was cancelled due to the then-occurring aftermath of the September 11 attacks. The story eventually appeared in 2019 under the same name, Good Omens, as a 6-episode series streaming on Amazon Prime Video and aired by BBC Two, but it was directed by Douglas Mackinnon, starring Michael Sheen and David Tennant.

Untitled Gorillaz movie 
It was rumoured that Gilliam may direct or be involved in the production of the animated band Gorillaz movie. In a September 2006 interview with Uncut, Damon Albarn was reported to have said, "we're making a film. We've got Terry Gilliam involved." However, in a more recent interview with Gorillaz-Unofficial, Jamie Hewlett, the co-creator of the band, stated that since the time of the previous interview, Damon's and his own interest in the film had lessened. In an August 2008 Observer interview, Gorillaz band members Albarn and Hewlett revealed the nature and title of the project, Journey to the West, a film adaptation of the opera of the same name, based on a 16th-century Chinese adventure story also known as Monkey. In January 2008, while on set of The Imaginarium of Doctor Parnassus, Gilliam stated that he was looking forward to the project, "But I'm still waiting to see a script!"

The World Jones Made
In 2009, it was announced that Gilliam was going to adapt Philip K. Dick’s The World Jones Made into a feature film.

Offers

Enemy Mine
Gilliam turned down the offer to direct Enemy Mine (1985).

Who Framed Roger Rabbit
Gilliam also turned down the offer to direct Who Framed Roger Rabbit (1988).  According to Gilliam, "I passed on that one, but that didn’t matter because it was just at a stage when it was still just the book and I didn’t want to get into animation. I just read the book and said, ‘This is too much work.’ Pure laziness on my part."  The film wound up being directed by Robert Zemeckis.

The Addams Family
According to Barry Sonnenfeld, Gilliam turned down the offer to direct The Addams Family (1991).

Alien sequel
Gilliam confirmed in 2018 that he turned down an offer to direct one of the sequels to Alien (1979).  It is presumed he turned down Alien 3 (1992) even though Gilliam did not specify which of the sequels he was referring to.

Forrest Gump
Gilliam turned down the offer to direct Forrest Gump (1994).

Braveheart
Gilliam turned down the offer to direct Braveheart (1995).

Son of Strangelove
In 1995, Stanley Kubrick hired Terry Southern to write the script that would have been the sequel to Kubrick's 1964 film Dr. Strangelove.  The film was to have been titled Son of Strangelove and Kubrick wanted Gilliam to direct it.  The script was never completed.  Gilliam said in 2013, "I was told after Kubrick died—by someone who had been dealing with him—that he had been interested in trying to do another Strangelove with me directing. I never knew about that until after he died but I would have loved to."

The Truman Show
Gilliam was among the list of filmmakers considered to direct The Truman Show (1998) before Peter Weir assumed the position.

Harry Potter
Gilliam was reportedly J.K. Rowling's first choice to direct Harry Potter and the Philosopher's Stone (2001), the first film of the Harry Potter movies.  In a 2013 interview with Entertainment Weekly, Gilliam stated, "J.K. Rowling and the producer wanted me. Then wiser people — studio heads — prevailed. I was the clear choice. At one point they approached Alan Parker and he said, ‘Why are you talking to me? Gilliam is the guy who should be doing this!’ But I knew I was never going to get the job."  Gilliam was ultimately rejected by Warner Bros.  Instead, the studio replaced Gilliam with Chris Columbus.  Gilliam reportedly criticized the studio's decision of picking Columbus over him and stated, "I was the perfect guy to do Harry Potter. I remember leaving the meeting, getting in my car, and driving for about two hours along Mulholland Drive just so angry. I mean, Chris Columbus' versions are terrible. Just dull. Pedestrian."

Gilliam turned down the offer to direct Harry Potter and the Half-Blood Prince (2009), the sixth film of the series.  When asked if he was interested in directing any of the Harry Potter movies, Gilliam replied, "Warner Bros. had their chance the first time around, and they blew it. It's a factory job, that's what it is, and I know the way it's done. I've had too many friends work on those movies. I know the way it works, and that's not the way I work."  In 2011, Gilliam expressed his regret entering into talks to direct the first Harry Potter film.

Lemony Snicket's A Series of Unfortunate Events
Daniel Handler revealed in an interview that Gilliam had been interested in directing the film adaptation of Lemony Snicket's A Series of Unfortunate Events.

The Sandman
In 2007, Neil Gaiman expressed interest in having Gilliam direct a film adaptation of The Sandman.

References

Gilliam, Terry
Works by Terry Gilliam